Sharon S. Steckman (born 1947 in Chicago, Illinois) is a member of the Iowa House of Representatives, representing the 59th District since 2008. She has a B.S. degree in education from Iowa State University and a M.S. degree, also in education, from Morningside College.

, Steckman is a member of several committees in the Iowa House – Ranking Chair of Education, State Government, Environmental Protection, and Education Appropriations committees. She is also the ranking member of the Education Committee and a member of the Midwestern Higher Education Compact.  In October 2009, she was elected Assistant House Majority Leader, becoming Assistant House Minority Leader when the Democrats lost their majority in 2011.

Electoral history
*incumbent

References

External links

 Representative Sharon Steckman official Iowa General Assembly site
 Re-Elect Sharon Steckman for Iowa House official campaign site
 
 Financial information (state office) at the National Institute for Money in State Politics

1947 births
Date of birth missing (living people)
Living people
Democratic Party members of the Iowa House of Representatives
University of Nebraska at Kearney alumni
Iowa State University alumni
Morningside University alumni
Politicians from Chicago
People from Mason City, Iowa
Educators from Iowa
Women state legislators in Iowa
21st-century American politicians
21st-century American women politicians
Educators from Illinois
American women educators